The silvery salamander (Ambystoma platineum) is a hybrid species of mole salamander from the United States of America and Canada. It is usually between 5.5 – 7.75 in (12 – 19.9 cm) long and is slender with many small silvery-blue spots on its back and sides. It is brownish grey and the area around its vent is grey. This unisexual Ambystoma hybrid species, has been grouped with other unisexual ambystomatids that takes genetic material from Jefferson salamander (A. jeffersonianum), streamside salamander (A. barbouri), small-mouthed salamander (A. texanum), tiger salamander (A. tigrinum) and the blue-spotted salamander (A. laterale).

"Species name designations for unisexual Ambystoma are no longer in use". Instead, unisexual Ambystoma are now considered distinct biotypes rather than species.

Behaviour 
Lacking its own males, the LJJ biotype breeds with male blue-spotted or Jefferson salamanders from March to April. The males' spermatophores only stimulate egg development; their genetic material does not contribute to the offspring's DNA. This mode of reproduction (a form of natural cloning) is called gynogenesis. The females lay cylindrical egg masses and attach them to underwater twigs. This salamander is not often observed and its diet and lifestyle are unknown.

Habitat and range 
These salamanders live almost anywhere between south-central Michigan to adjacent Indiana and Ohio to western Massachusetts south to northern New Jersey. They are commonly found in or near shallow rivers and ponds in deciduous forest. There is an extremely limited population of the salamanders in Vermilion County, Illinois with only one remaining natural population known. They are considered endangered within the state. Theory states that the population may have dropped due to the vernal pool in which they live not retaining water for a long enough period for their tadpoles to reach metamorphosis.

Predators 
The LJJ biotype's predators include birds, fish, raccoons, and dogs.

Diet 
Their diet is mainly slugs, ants, spiders, soft insects, and worms.

See also 
Tremblay's salamander
Jefferson salamander
Blue-spotted salamander

References 

National Audubon Society Field Guide to Reptiles and Amphibians
Pfingsten, R.A., J.G. Davis, T.O. Matson, G.J. Lipps Jr., D. Wynn, and B.J. Armitage (Editors). Amphibians of Ohio (2013). Ohio Biological Survey Bulletin New Series, Volume 17, Number 1. xiv + 899 pages

Mole salamanders
Amphibians described in 1856